Enrique Tobias Korrodi (born September 20, 1983) is a former American football quarterback. He was the starting quarterback for Central Missouri through 2006.  At 6-foot-4, 234 pounds, Korrodi had the size to be considered an NFL prospect. At the 2007 Combine, he topped all passers in the ball-speed drill by recording a 63 mph pass.

On May 1, 2007, Korrodi signed as an undrafted free agent with the Arizona Cardinals.  The Cardinals released him on August 23, 2007.

High school years
Korrodi attended Harlandale High School in San Antonio, Texas.  Toby graduated from Harlandale High School in 2002.

Korrodi married wife, Laura, his senior year of high school.  The couple has three children Toby 15, Jacob 14, and Carly, 12. His parents are Isaac C. Korrodi and Alicia G. Korrodi.

External links
 
 NFL Draft Scout

1983 births
Living people
Players of American football from San Antonio
American football quarterbacks
Central Missouri Mules football players
Arizona Cardinals players